Daugava is the eighth studio album by Lars Winnerbäck.  It was recorded in Ireland, and released on September 26, 2007. The name comes from the river that runs through Riga.

The album has sold in excess of 80,000 copies in Sweden, and has been certified 2× platinum.

Track listing
"", Farewell Jupiter
"", I've Been Waiting for a Rainfall
"", Before Darkness Falls
"" (duet with Miss Li), If You Left Me Now
"", A Town on a Plain
"", And Wind is Blowing Through the Hall
"", My Healing Solace
"", I Don't Get Anything
"", What's Troubling Sara Wehn
"", Come Home Now
"", Walk on Water
"", From Time to Time

Charts

Weekly charts

Year-end charts

References

2007 albums
Lars Winnerbäck albums
Swedish-language albums